The Himalayan Sheepdog, known locally by various names including the Bhote, Bangara or Gaddi Kutta, and sometimes called the Himalayan Mastiff, is a breed of livestock guardian dog from the Himalayas, covering   India. The Himalayan Sheepdog is found in the Himalayan foothills from eastern Nepal to Kashmir. The breed is primarily used as a livestock guardian dog, protecting flocks of yak and sheep from various predators, and as a property guardian dog; unusually for a livestock guardian, the breed is also used to assist with herding. The Himalayan Sheepdog is also used to assist in hunting.

Description

The Himalayan Sheepdog is very closely related to the slightly larger Tibetan Mastiff. The breed's double coat is typically harsh and thick and they are usually black and tan or solid black with some white markings on their toes, chest and neck. They have small drooped ears and a heavily plumed tail that is curled over their back. There are slightly distinct sub-varieties of the breed found in the Kumaon hills and Chamba; the former, which is known as the Cypro Kukur or Kumaon Mastiff, is brindle, rich golden brown or black in colour, the latter is smaller than most of the breed and resemble a larger, longer-haired black Labrador Retriever.

In 2005 the Himalayan Sheepdog was one of four Indian dog breeds featured on a set of postage stamps released by the Indian Ministry of Communications and Information Technology to celebrate the country's canine heritage.

See also
 Dogs portal
 List of dog breeds
 List of dog breeds from India
 Kuchi

References 

Dog breeds originating in Asia
Livestock guardian dogs
Dog breeds originating in India